The Peruvian Hairless Dog, Peruvian viringo, naked dog, or Chimú dog is one of several breeds of hairless dog. It is native to Peru and it is usually raised as a pet. It has been officially recognized as part of Peru's cultural heritage.

Appearance

According to the FCI breed standard, the most important aspect of its appearance is its hairlessness. The dog may have short hair on top of its head, on its feet, and on the tip of its tail. In Peru, breeders tend to prefer completely hairless dogs. 
The color of skin can be chocolate-brown, elephant-grey, copper, or mottled. They can be totally one color or one color with tongue pink spots. Albinism is not accepted. The eye color is linked to the skin color. It is always brown, but dogs with light colors can have clearer eyes than darker-skinned dogs.

Peruvian Hairless Dogs come in three sizes:
Small 25 – 40 cm (10 – 16 inches)
Medium 40 – 50 cm (16 – 20 inches)
Large 50 – 65 cm (20 – 26 inches)

Weight is also varied according to size :
Small  4 – 8 kg (9 – 18 lbs)
Medium  8 – 12 kg (18 – 26 lbs)
Large  12 – 25 kg (26 – 55 lbs)

The dogs should be slim and elegant, with the impression of force and harmony, without being coarse.

The ears should be candle-flame shaped and erect with the possibility to lay flat.

Proportions of height (at withers) to length (withers to base of tail) are 1:1.

Temperament

The breed's bald bodies radiate heat. Many in Peru use the dogs as living hot-water bottles for warmth at night, or pain management. They are intelligent, affectionate with family, but wary of strangers, and very protective of women and children in the family. The breed is typically lively, alert and friendly with other dogs.
They are agile and fast, and many of them enjoy sight-hunting small rodents.
These dogs do not like to be alone, but when trained, can do well. They tend to know their allowed territories and respect it.
These dogs are intolerant of extreme temperatures, although they are quite comfortable wearing clothing and will even play in the snow if dressed warmly. 
They generally require an owner that understands dog language and are not recommended for beginners.
They learn fast, and they are very smart, but get bored easily with repetitious games like "fetch".

Care

The lack of hair leads to a reputation for being easy to wash and for a natural lack of fleas. The breed does not cause typical allergic reactions to dog-sensitive humans because they lack the normal dog dander. Dogs should be washed from time to time to remove dirt and prevent clogging of pores. Baby cleaners are a good choice provided that they do not contain lanolin. Some dogs are prone to have acne or at least blackheads. The skin sometimes becomes too dry and can then be treated with moisturizing cream. Again, baby lotion without lanolin is a good product choice to soften and moisturize cleansed skin. The dogs seem to prefer olive oil, vegetable oil, or coconut oil, possibly because of the perfumes and other chemicals found in commercial moisturizing creams.

Sunscreen may be useful during summer for lightly colored/white dogs. When out-breeding Peruvians, typically select dark-coated dogs to ensure puppies with dark skin.

Protection against cold is necessary when the dog is not able to move around at its own speed under adverse weather conditions. Sensitivity to cold may vary from dog to dog. Smaller dogs seem to be more sensitive to the cold than larger dogs.  Even so, the dogs are kept in Puno at 3,800 meters altitude, where the average temperature is 15 degrees Celsius, and are fairly common in Cusco at 3,400 meters.

The rims of the ears sometimes need special attention as they can become dry and cracked.

Genetics and health

The gene that causes hairlessness also results in the breed often having fewer teeth than other breeds,mostly lacking molars and premolars. All are born with full sets of puppy teeth, but these are not fully replaced by adult teeth as they naturally fall out, leaving them with varying levels of adult dentition. 

The hairlessness trait is a dominant double lethal mutation, which means that homozygotic hairlessness does not exist. Homozygous embryos, those with two copies of the gene, do not develop in the womb. This results in an average birthrate of 2:1, hairless:coated.

While they are recognized by the American Kennel Club (AKC) in its Foundation Stock Service as the Peruvian Inca Orchid, they cannot be shown at AKC shows. They are also registerable with FCI, United Kennel Club, National Kennel Club, APRI, ACR registries. Some breeders think that interbreeding with coated (Peruvian) dogs is required to maintain functional teeth and nervous system health in subsequent generations. They say that breeding of hairless with hairless (and common but unacknowledged culling of coated pups from litters to maintain a "pure" image) leads to short-lived dogs with serious health problems. However, other breeders (especially in Peru) think the opposite and that they are doing well (and have been for centuries).  Peruvian non-breeder families typically out-breed with coated dogs every second or third generation to keep them healthy.

Like all dog breeds, there are some health problems. These include Inflammatory Bowel Disease, seizures, stroke, and skin lesions. The dogs are very sensitive to toxins and care should be taken in the use of insecticides. Insecticides are absorbed through the skin and body fat keeps these toxins from entering the liver too quickly. Since these dogs have very low body fat, toxins are absorbed too quickly and cause severe damage to the nervous system and GI tract.

History
The Peruvian Hairless Dog is often perceived to be an Incan dog because it is known to have been kept during the Inca Empire (the Spaniards classified them as one of the six different breeds of dogs in the empire), they were also kept as pets in pre-Inca cultures from the Peruvian northern coastal zone. Ceramic hairless dogs from the Chimú, Moche, and Vicus culture are well known. Depictions of Peruvian hairless dogs appear around A.D. 750 on Moche ceramic vessels and continue in later Andean ceramic traditions.

Peruvian Hairless Dogs are now a symbol of Peru and part of its national heritage, celebrated in art and literature. The Fédération Cynologique Internationale (FCI) accepted the breed and adopted an official breed standard. Before that time, in the United States, some enthusiasts created another type of Peruvian hairless dog, the Peruvian Inca Orchid.  The Peruvian Inca Orchid is recognized by the AKC and all recognized dogs are descendants of 13 dogs brought from Peru in the early 20th century. The UKC also recognized the breed in recent years.

DNA evidence
In 2018, an analysis of DNA from the entire cell nucleus indicated that dogs entered North America from Siberia 4,500 years after humans did, were isolated for the next 9,000 years, and after contact with Europeans these no longer exist because they were replaced by Eurasian dogs. The pre-contact dogs exhibit a unique genetic signature that is now gone.

See also
 Dogs portal
 List of dog breeds
 American Hairless Terrier
 Argentine Pila
 Chinese Crested Dog
 Chiribaya Dog, also known as Peruvian Shepherd Dog
 Rare breed (dog)
 Sphynx or Canadian Sphynx
 Xoloitzcuintle

References

External links 
 

Dog breeds originating in Peru
FCI breeds
Hairless dogs
Indigenous topics of the Andes
Rare dog breeds